Osteraker may refer to:
Österåker Municipality
Österåker Prison
På Österåker, a Johnny Cash album recorded at Österåker Prison